The Rape of the A*P*E* is a book by Allan Sherman, published in July 1973 by Playboy Press, regarding sex and its historical repression and resurgence in the United States. The "A.P.E." on the title is a play on the words "ape" and the "American Puritan Ethic".

The book was the subject of much publicity, when it appeared, due to both its subject and author.  Despite his ill health at the time, Sherman went on a two-week media tour to promote The Rape and appeared on many radio shows.  He died on November 20, 1973, just four months after the book was published.

References

Bibliography
The Rape of the A.P.E (American Puritan Ethic : The Official History of the Sex Revolution, 1945-1973 : The Obscening of America, an R.S. V.P.), Allan Sherman, Playboy Press, 1973, (OCLC )

Ethics books
Sexuality in the United States
1973 non-fiction books
Playboy Press books